Mahendra Narayan Nidhi (24 February 1922 – 4 May 1999) was a Nepali politician, democracy fighter, and Gandhian leader. He was the Minister of water resources and local development in the Interim government led by Krishna Prasad Bhattarai after the success of 1990 Nepalese revolution. He was one of the most influential leaders and General Secretary of Nepali Congress. He started his active political journey from Dhanusha in 1946. Nidhi was elected twice to the parliament, in 1959 and 1991. He was the first deputy speaker of Pratinidhi Sabha of Nepal. Nidhi had started Rajeshwor Nidhi Higher Secondary School during the Rana period in Nagrain, Dhanusha.

Personal life
Nidhi was born in 1922 in Nagarain, Dhanusha.

Honors
 2018 — Rastra Gaurav Man Padavi

See also
 Mahendra Narayan Nidhi Awas Yojana

References

1922 births
1999 deaths
Government ministers of Nepal
Nepali Congress politicians from Madhesh Province
People from Dhanusha District
Nepalese revolutionaries
Nepal MPs 1959–1960
Nepal MPs 1991–1994
Nepalese political party founders
20th-century Nepalese nobility
Nepalese democracy activists
Nidhi family